Nezha Regragui (born December 17, 1957) is a Moroccan theatre, TV and film actress. Regragui has participated in several plays and films, including Goodbye Mothers. She is also notable for being married to the singer Bachir Abdou and both being the parents of the Moroccan singer Saad Lamjarred.

Filmography

Film 
 1988: The Love Kaftan
 1989: Le Vent de la Toussaint
 1998: Old Friends
 1999: Mabrouk
 2005: Here and There
 2008: Goodbye Mothers
 2009: Awlad Lablad

Television 
 Al Ferqa
 2002: Men Dar Ldar
 2006: Khali 3mara
 2008: Khater Men Dir
 2019: Daba Tzian

Theatre 
 Maraat Lati
 Sa3a Mabrouka
 Hada Enta

References

1957 births
Living people
Moroccan film actresses
Moroccan television actresses
People from Rabat